Podlaskie Museum in Białystok is a museum which is based in Białystok the capital of Podlaskie Voivodeship in north-eastern Poland with affiliates in Bielsk-Podlaski.

History
It was established in 1949 by the decree of the Ministry of Culture and Arts as the first regional museum in the history of the city.

His seat became the rebuilt right wing of the Branicki Palace. In March 1950, the museum was moved to the Guest Palace from the second half. 18th century at Kilińskiego Street. On January 1, 1952, the institution was nationalized, and substantive supervision over it took over the National Museum of Warsaw. After eight years of existence, on July 27, 1957, the Regional Museum gained the rank of a district museum and took care of the regional museums in Łomża and Suwałki.

On September 13, 1958, the museum moved to the rebuilt town hall. Due to the expansion of the area, new workshops were established - next to the existing, historical and archeological ones, in 1958 an art workshop was established, in 1962 an ethnographic workshop, and in 1965 an academic and educational workshop.

In 1973, the museum developed rapidly, it was handed over to the palace in Choroszcz, where an interior exhibition was created. A Museum Point was also created in the refectory and chapel of the former Abbots' Palace in Supraśl. Two years later, the historical workshop moved from the guest palace at 1 Kilińskiego Street to the historic Cytron Palace at Warszawska 37 Street. A new branch was established in Tykocin, based in the rebuilt synagogue and Talmudic house.

In 1982 and in the areas located in Wasilków on the road to Augustów, the Bialystok Village Museum was established. In 1984, in the renovated town hall in Bielsk Podlaski a branch was established. The turn of the century brought further name changes to the institutions: on April 27, 1998 at the State Museum in Bialystok, and on April 25, 2000 it was renamed the Podlaskie Museum in Bialystok.

From January 1, 2020, the Podlaskie Museum is co-run by the Ministry of Culture and National Heritage and the Podlaskie Voivodeship. A 10-year contract in this matter was signed on December 17, 2019.

Collection highlights

References

External links

Art museums and galleries in Poland
Museums established in 1949
Museums in Białystok